Marvel's Moon Girl and Devil Dinosaur, or simply Moon Girl and Devil Dinosaur, is an American animated television series developed by Steve Loter, Jeffrey M. Howard, and Kate Kondell for Disney Channel. Based on the characters of the same names by Marvel Comics, the series follows Lunella Lafayette and her dinosaur companion "Devil Dinosaur".

The series stars the voices of Diamond White, Fred Tatasciore, Alfre Woodard, Sasheer Zamata, Jermaine Fowler, Gary Anthony Williams, Libe Barer, and Laurence Fishburne. Development began after Marvel Studios president Louis D'Esposito showed Fishburne the comic book Moon Girl and Devil Dinosaur. His interest piqued, Fishburne sought to make an animated series based on the duo. Production proceeded for two years before Steve Loter was hired as an executive producer. After a successful pitch to Disney Television Animation executives, the series was greenlit and publicly announced in February 2018. It is produced by Cinema Gypsy Productions, Disney Television Animation, and Marvel Animation, with animation by Flying Bark Productions.

In October 2022, ahead of the series premiere, the series was renewed for a second season. Marvel's Moon Girl and Devil Dinosaur premiered on Disney Channel on February 10, 2023, and was released on Disney+ five days later. The series received acclaim from critics and audiences for its writing, animation, and soundtrack.

Premise
Lunella Lafayette is a 13-year-old genius living with her parents and grandparents in the Lower East Side of New York. One day, she activates a portal, and a red Tyrannosaurus with steps out of it. With the support of her friend, Casey, she becomes a superheroine named Moon Girl and names the dinosaur "Devil Dinosaur".

Characters

Main
 Diamond White as Lunella Lafayette / Moon Girl, a gifted 13-year-old Black girl who lives a double life as a superheroine and accidentally brings Devil Dinosaur into present-day New York.
 Fred Tatasciore as:
 Devil Dinosaur, a red Tyrannosaurus with horns and three fingers who accidentally brought to present-day New York City by Lunella.
 Coach Hrbek, Lunella's coach at school who also works as a substitute science teacher.
 Devos the Devastator, a robotic being who speaks in third person.
 Alfre Woodard as Mimi, Lunella's grandmother.
 Sasheer Zamata as Adria Lafayette, Lunella's mother.
 Jermaine Fowler as James Lafayette Jr., Lunella's father.
 Gary Anthony Williams as Pops, Lunella's grandfather.
 Libe Barer as Casey Calderon, Lunella's manager and best friend of Puerto Rican and Jewish ancestry, and the only one who knows her identity as Moon Girl.
 Laurence Fishburne as The Beyonder, a trickster with immense cosmic powers who is described as "curious and mischievous". He is here to judge humanity to see if they are worthy of existence. The Beyonder also provides background information about Lunella's foes (credited as "Backstory Man" for his voiceover narration in earlier episodes).

Recurring
 Omid Abtahi as Ahmed, one of Lunella's neighbors who runs a deli.
 Utkarsh Ambudkar as Anand, an intellectual rival of Lunella.
 Michael Cimino as Eduardo, Lunella's friend who is loud and loves music.
 Indya Moore as Brooklyn, a friend of Lunella's who is openly trans.
 Craig Robinson as Principal Nelson, the principal at Lunella's school.

Guest
 Alison Brie as Ms. Dillon / Aftershock, an electric-powered supervillain and former science teacher.
 Josh Keaton as Angelo, a boy with community-helping plans who becomes possessed by a trolling Symbiote called Syphon8er.
 Carlee Baker as Sofie Slugfoot / Instantanegirl, an ex-hurdler who took a chemical compound that enhanced her leg muscles to give her more speed which got her banned from the Olympic games.
 Aaron Drown as Timmy Grubbs / Man Baby, the infant son of a scientist who was accidentally enlarged by his scientist father's growth rays
 Ace Gibson as Gravitas, a supervillain whose gloves can shoot liquid that negates targets' gravity.
 Andy Cohen as Isaac Goldberg-Calderon, one of Casey's fathers
 Wilson Cruz as Mr. Goldberg-Calderon, one of Casey's fathers
 Asia Kate Dillon as LOS-307, a non-binary living supercomputer. They would later become the new school counselor at Lunella's school after Miss Sarah's retirement.
 Ian Alexander as Tai, a non-binary classmate of Lunella's.
 Jennifer Hudson as Mane, Lunella's vengeful living hair.
 Tajinae Turner as Geri, a classmate of Lunella's.
 Kari Wahlgren as Linh Pham / Stiletto, a supervillain and shopaholic of high-heeled shoes whose special stilettos can expand to long heights.
 Maya Hawke as Abyss, a teleporter who is the daughter of a female supervillain.
 Daveed Diggs as Rat King, a humanoid rat villain who lives in the sewers.
 Mae Jemison as Skipster, an app created by Lunella that can skip forward in time and is made to sound like Dr. Mae Jemison.
 May Calamawy as Fawzia, a Muslim classmate of Lunella's.
 Luis Guzmán as President Council Diego Peña, the head of the L.E.S. city council.
 June Diane Raphael as Marcy Muzzler, a scientist who is obsessed with gentrification.
 Paul Scheer as Marty Muzzler, a scientist and husband of Marcy who is obsessed with gentrification.
 Gideon Adlon
 Pamela Adlon
 Anna Akana
 Method Man
 Cobie Smulders as Maria Hill, an agent of S.H.I.E.L.D. who works under director Nick Fury. Smulders reprises her role from the Marvel Cinematic Universe.
 Wesley Snipes

Episodes

Production

Development

During discussions with Marvel Studios regarding a potential collaboration with Cinema Gypsy Productions for a Marvel Cinematic Universe (MCU) project, president Louis D'Esposito showed actor and comic book fan Laurence Fishburne the comic book Moon Girl and Devil Dinosaur. Having read the original Moon-Boy and Devil Dinosaur comic book as a child, Moon Girl piqued Fishburne's interest. He afterwards began reading the comics, which gave him the inspiration to create an animated series based on the duo. Fishburne and a production team worked on the series for two years at Disney Television Animation, before hiring Steve Loter as executive-producer due to his experience on female-centered shows such as Disney's Kim Possible. Loter and the team then created a roller-skating sequence played over "Sweatpants" by Childish Gambino as a proof-of-concept piece and pitched it to executives at Disney Television Animation, who greenlit the series for development.

On February 20, 2018, it was reported that Marvel Animation and Cinema Gypsy Productions were developing a Moon Girl and Devil Dinosaur series for Disney Channel Worldwide. Fishburne (a long-time Marvel alumni; having played Silver Surfer in Fantastic Four: Rise of the Silver Surfer and Bill Foster in Ant-Man and the Wasp) and Helen Sugland serve as the series' executive producers. The first season had 20 episodes ordered.
 
On August 24, 2019, during the D23 Expo, Fishburne revealed that the series would premiere in 2020 on Disney Channel, with Disney Television Animation being set to co-produce the series, marking the first time Disney and Marvel worked together on an animated series. Loter executive produces the series alongside Fishburne and Sugland. Jeff Howard and Kate Kondell work on the series as co-producers and story editors. Howard and Kondell were the first two writers hired for the series. The two helped the production team define the characters, with an hour being dedicated to a specific character. By the time writing for the episodes started, the characters were defined enough that not many ideas were revised. Kondell also serves as head writer for the series. 
 
Fishburne said that "Disney Channel is the perfect platform to explore this pint-sized female African American superhero and [he] can't wait for their audience to enjoy the lighthearted adventures of Lunella and Devil Dinosaur", while Cort Lae, Marvel Family and Entertainment's then-senior vice president, said that "[Moon Girl's] adventures with giant buddy, Devil Dinosaur, are filled with so much wonder and joy, and this historic partnership with Disney Television Animation and Cinema Gypsy Productions proved the right formula to bring them to television".

In February 2021, it was reported that Rodney Clouden will serve as supervising producer for the series, while Pilar Flynn will produce. Due to Disney Television Animation's studios having closed in 2020 in response to the COVID-19 pandemic, most of the series was produced remotely. The producers developed each episode with a feature film-like pipeline, with each script receiving a "color script" as with films, and each episode being treated as a "mini-movie". The producers wanted the team to be composed of people with different filmmaking experiences.

In October 2022, the series was renewed for a second season. The series was renewed after a positive reception from both Disney and Marvel executives. Rafael Chaidez will take over as producer for season two, while Flynn and Clouden will serve as co-executive producers alongside Kondell. Kondell will also serve as story editor alongside Halima Lucas, the latter who will also be a co-producer alongside Ben Juwono, who will replace Clouden as supervising director. Production for season 2 began by February 2023.

Writing 
The series features a writing and directing crew consisting entirely of female writers of color, as the showrunners wanted the production team to reflect the diversity within New York City, where the show is set. The writers, alongside other crew members of color, were allowed to provide feedback regarding representation of minorities within the show, with some of said crew members receiving promotions within the crew while working on the series. The crew also worked alongside Disney production coordinator Almen March to identify moments to add diversity to the show via background or speaking characters, as well as to calculate the representation per episode. Loter, who lives in New York City, said that it was important for the crew to "make sure they've got New York right", wanting to respect the city's "vibe" and "tone". He also reused elements of the series' potrayal of NYC from his cancelled Cars spin-off film Metro, such as promeniently featuring the New York City Hall station, which appears in the series as Lunella's lab. The series starts off with an episodic format as it explores Lunella becoming Moon Girl, before transitioning into a more serialized story, with an arc unfolding throughout the first season.

Supervising producer Rodney Clouden said it was important for the production crew to accurately portray a multigenerational African-American family. They wanted to show both Moon Girl learning from her family and her family learning from her through their multiple perspectives. Each character was given a different personality and profession, such as Pops being owner of a roller-skate and Andria being a DJ, to further explore diversity and how "everyone is so different [from each other]". Sasheer Zamata, who voices Lunella's mother, said that family is a crucial theme in the show, and described the series as "a nice way to see a Black family work together and enjoy each other and spread love in their community". Producer Pylar Flynn said it was important for the writers to have Moon Girl and Casey have a close and supportive relationship, which is rarely seen among female friendships in animation.

The producers used the original comic as "a springboard" and "a point of reference" for the series, although making several alterations regarding the source material to make the story fit in a television format while still incorporating nods to multiple comic-book storylines. According to Diamond White, the series features "levels of emotions" that were absent from the original comic. The series portrays the relationship between the duo as "a partnership" instead of "a pet/owner dynamic", with Devil becoming fiercely loyal to Moon Girl and feeling "at home with her" due to how she treats him. Another changes were the increased role of Lunella's family and the addition of her friend Casey, which were made to showcase how Lunella's world changes as she grows through the series. They also felt it was important for Lunella to have a support system, and for her household to represent that of many audiences' households. The producers changed Lunella's age from 9 to 13-years-old because they wanted social media to play a prominent role in her character, which they felt would not work with her being 9-years-old.

The series features several obscure characters from Marvel comics. The characters included were selected due to potential roles they could play in the story, interest from the producers, and/or recommendations from Marvel, such as the Beyonder, who was suggested by Marvel Studios president Kevin Feige as a foil for Lunella; the producers were particularly interested in featuring characters that hadn't been adapted to other media before, such as Aftershock, as their obscurity allowed the creators to make changes that fitted within the show's narrative, though more prominent Marvel characters are also set to appear. Fishburne noted, however, that some characters were unable to appear due to "proprietary issues". Elements from Marvel comics will appear more prominently later in the series, after Lunella and "her world" are properly established. Some of the villains represent real-life issues within the show, such as Aftershock draining the Lower East Side's energy in the first episode, which serves as "a statement" about gentrification. The series was also described as "complimentary" to the MCU, with the creators including multiple nods to the franchise through the series. Fishburne claimed that the series is not "connected to the MCU officially", while Loter revealed that "a couple of MCU characters" will appear in the series.

Casting
In February 2021, it was reported that White and Tatasciore will voice the titular duo, with Woodard, Williams, Zamata, and Fowler providing the voices of Lunella/Moon Girl's grandparents and parents, respectively, and Barer as her best friend, Casey. It was also reported that Fishburne will voice The Beyonder in a recurring capacity. Additional recurring and guest roles were announced the San Diego Comic Con in July 2022. White was cast shortly after Loter heard her audition tape; according to Loter, her tape was the only one he heard, as he was impressed with her performance.

Voice recordings for season one were partially done remotely due to the COVID-19 pandemic. Williams, whose work on the show was his first role during the pandemic, received help from his wife to prepare to record his lines from their home. White and Barer ad-libbed several dialogues between Moon Girl and Casey, with the two recording their lines simultaneously either physically or through Zoom. White also recorded some of her lines with Tatatsciore, as well as with Woodward, Zamata, and Williams. While providing the vocal effects for Devil, Tatasciore was given a script with lines for him, which he would later work into animal vocals. The idea of Fishburne voicing the Beyonder was suggested by Loter. For his performance, Fishburne wanted it to be lighter and less recognizable than his previous roles, so he and Loter worked together to develop his voice for the Beyonder.

Animation
The series is animated by Flying Bark Productions, in Sydney, Austrailia. Titmouse worked on early visual development for the series. Flying Bark, whose employees were fans of the source material, was hired due to the studio's work on Rise of the Teenage Mutant Ninja Turtles. Animation lead Kat Kosmala created a series of rules for the animators, among them being that the character animation must draw the viewers' attention, the action must be "simple and direct", and simplification should be used only for designs. The visual style is meant to "[lean] heavy into [a] 2D graphic comicbook sensibility". The animation combines hand-drawn animation with Toon Boom Harmony, with Toon Boom being used for stage and head-rigging, while the bodies of the characters are hand-drawn. The producers originally planned to only use Toon Boom, but ultimately felt hand-drawn animation was also required.

Multiple animation styles were used per episode. For the New York sequences, the producers drew inspiration from graffiti artists, as well as artists such as Andy Warhol, for the series' art style, to portray New York in a more realistic style than most animated shows, while also portraying the city as its own character. Loter and Clouden drew inspiration from their childhood for the series' portrayal of NYC. Graffiti artists were hired to work on the graffiti depicted through the show to show accurate graffiti. The camera movement was also meant to evoke the feeling of a real-life city recording, with "forced tight shots" and "object obstruction". The buildings and streets were also drawn to be accurate to their real-life counterparts. The musical sequences feature a more abstract art style that is more colorful and action-focused. Flashback sequences feature a simpler graphic style with colors that "quickly enhance emotional beats".

Due to Fishburne's love of comic books, producers also wanted the animation to "feel like an illustrated moving comic book", so the artists drew inspiration from comic books from the 1970s, featuring a lack of "perfect shapes" and "edgy line work", while having a hand-drawn feel. Details such as black spots were also added so they could "[feel] like a very complete piece" even before adding color. Artists wanted to avoid using digital techniques such as motion blur, wanting instead to rely mainly on ink-and-paint techniques. The animation also drew inspiration from Spider-Man: Into the Spider-Verse, with the producers wanting the animation to be as energetic as possible within a budget for a TV series. The animators also sought for the animation to be "complimentary" to Into the Spider-Verse without recycling its animation style. Marvel Studios Animation's What If...? was also an influence on the series' visual design.

Lead character designer Jose Lopez wanted the characters to have multiple shapes that were "fun to look at", such as Moon Girl's silhouette changing when she dons her superhero outfit. He also wanted Devil Dinosaur to look like "a mean dinosaur" while also being "believable as a lovable pet". He also drew inspiration from comic strip artist Bill Watterson, of whom Lopez is a fan of. Marc Hempel and Devil's co-creator Jack Kirby were also inspirations for the art style of the show, with the artists incorporating the Kirby Krackle into the series. The artists also incorporated elements to visually represent the characters' feelings, such as manga-style "flairs", as well as emojis that were "simple and clear and direct".

Music
In July 2022, it was announced that Raphael Saadiq would serve as the executive music producer for the show. He also provided both the score and songs for the show. Loter, a fan of Saadiq, approached him to work on the project during an autograph signing. Each episode features a different song by Saadiq, depicted in-universe as part of a mix-tape Moon Girl listens to; the songs were written before animation work began so the animators could synchronize the songs to the sequence. Saadiq included different musical genres in the soundtrack to reflect the diversity within New York City. Producer Pylar Flynn described his score as "sophisticated" and "unlike anything [she has] seen in animation before", saying it "elevated the entire show to another level". According to Flynn, the crew generally pitched ideas for the score to Saadiq, only for him to discard them in favor of something different, which the producers received positively. The first episode features a song titled "Where You Come From", which Loter described as "a love letter to New York". Saadiq also wrote songs for the series' villains.

The show's theme song, "Moon Girl Magic", was performed written by Saadiq alongside Halima Lucas and Taura Stinson, and performed by White. The song was written by Saadiq with "a similar energy" to "Juice" by Lizzo, and received an "instant green-light" by the executives, which is rare for most theme songs for a TV series. Saadiq said he wanted the song to be both "uplifting" and "happy", while White was excited to "bring Lunella's voice to the show in a singing way". The title sequence was storyboarded by supervising director Ben Juwono, who drew inspiration from the music video for Cyndi Lauper's "Girls Just Want to Have Fun" and storyboarded it to play to "Juice", as the theme song had not been written by that point. The song was released as a single on November 14, 2022.

A soundtrack featuring selected songs from the series was released on February 10, 2023.

Release
Moon Girl and Devil Dinosaur premiered on Disney Channel on February 10, 2023. The series was originally scheduled to premiere in 2020, before being delayed to 2022, and later to its current premiere date. The first six episodes of the series were added to Disney+ on February 15, 2023, resulting in episodes 3 to 6 being released prior to their television debuts.

Marketing
A teaser trailer showing clips from the opening was released by executive-producer Laurence Fishburne in December 15, 2021. An official clip was released during the San Diego Comic-Con 2022, while the first trailer was released during the D23 Expo, where the first episode was shown to the attendees. The series' intro was released during the New York Comic-Con 2022, with the first two minutes of the season premiere also being shown during the panel. A music video for the theme song was released in November 14, 2022.

Merchandising for the show will include apparel and a series of toys produced by The World of EPI and Funko Pop! that serve as tie-ins for the series. Characters from Moon Girl and Devil Dinosaur appear as limited-time meet-and-greet characters at the Avengers Campus at Disney California Adventure starting from February 15, 2023, in commemoration of Black History Month. A soundtrack featuring songs from the first season, in digital and audio cassette formats, was released on January 4, 2023 by Walt Disney Records.

Reception
On the review aggregator website Rotten Tomatoes, the first season holds an approval rating of 100%, based on 14 reviews with an with an average rating of 8.6/10. The site's critical consensus reads: "With dazzling visuals and punchy pacing that feel beamed straight from a child's imagination, Moon Girl and Devil Dinosaur will enthrall kids while impressing animation connoisseurs."

Joel Keller of Decider asserted, "Marvel's Moon Girl And Devil Dinosaur is a dynamic, smart, visually arresting series that has a unique girl at its center, a puppy-like dinosaur, and stories that will entertain both kids and their parents." Matthew Aguilar of ComicBook.com gave the series a 4 out of 5, writing, "Marvel's Moon Girl and Devil Dinosaur is an enchanting adventure that wears its heart and charm on its sleeve. The show carves out a corner of the Marvel universe all its own with personality for days and characters that leap off the screen, and any Marvel fan will regret missing out on this one-of-a-kind gem."

Notes

References

External links
 
 

2020s American animated television series
2020s American black cartoons
2023 American television series debuts
American black superhero television shows
American children's animated action television series
American children's animated adventure television series
American children's animated musical television series
American children's animated science fiction television series
American children's animated superhero television series
Animated series produced by Marvel Studios
Animated superheroine television shows
Animated television series about dinosaurs
Animated television series based on Marvel Comics
Anime-influenced Western animated television series
Disney Channel original programming
English-language television shows
Marvel Animation
Teen animated television series
Teen superhero television series
Television series by Disney Television Animation
Television shows set in New York City